Sol Polito, A.S.C. (born Salvatore Polito, November 12, 1892 – May 23, 1960) was a Sicilian-American cinematographer. He is best known for his work with directors Michael Curtiz and Mervyn LeRoy at Warner Bros. studios in the 1930s and 1940s.

Biography
Salvatore Polito was born November 12, 1892 in Palermo, Italy, and immigrated to the United States in 1905. He attended school in New York City and began working in the motion picture industry as a still photographer. After experience as a lab assistant and camera assistant, he was promoted to lighting cameraman in 1917.

Polito married Frances (Francesca) D'Angelis in New York in 1914. The union produced two sons. The elder son Gene Polito (1918-2010) also became a cinematographer. Younger son S. Robert Polito (1922–2015) became a physician.

Polito moved from Brooklyn to Los Angeles in 1919 to continue his career at First National Pictures and Warner Bros. He worked on more than 170 films at various studios, but is best known for his work at Warner Bros. with directors Michael Curtiz and Mervyn LeRoy.

Polito died in Los Angeles on May 23, 1960, aged 67, and was entombed in the Mausoleum at Calvary Cemetery in East Los Angeles, California.

Accolades
Polito received three Academy Award nominations:
 1939: The Private Lives of Elizabeth and Essex, Best Cinematography (Color), shared with W. Howard Greene
 1941: Sergeant York, Best Cinematography (Black and White)
 1942: Captains of the Clouds, Best Cinematography (Color)

Select filmography

References

External links

 Sol Polito at Great Cinemagraphers, Internet Encyclopedia of Cinematographers

1892 births
1960 deaths
American cinematographers
People from New York City
Italian emigrants to the United States